The Ceylon Armed Services Long Service Medal (Sinhala: සන්නද්ධ සේවා දීර්ඝ සේවා පදක්කම ārakśaka sēvā dhīrgha sēvā padakkama) was a service medal of Ceylon from 1968 to 1972. It was granted to all ranks of the regular forces of the Ceylon Army, Royal Ceylon Navy and Royal Ceylon Air Force provided they had completed 12 years of service. It was replaced by the Sri Lanka Armed Services Long Service Medal in 1972 when Sri Lanka became a republic.

References

Army, Sri Lanka. (1st Edition - October 1999). "50 YEARS ON" - 1949-1999, Sri Lanka Army.

External links
Sri Lanka Army
Sri Lanka Navy
Sri Lanka Air Force
Ministry of Defence : Sri Lanka

Military awards and decorations of Sri Lanka
Awards established in 1968
Long service medals
1968 establishments in Ceylon